Ninja Rabbits is video game released in 1991 by MicroValue. The protagonist is an anthropomorphic rabbit with dark brown fur, a stick, and a ninja costume. He has to save a factory from destruction.  The game was followed by International Ninja Rabbits.

Gameplay

The protagonist has a carrot as a life bar. As he takes damage, his carrot bar gets eaten. When his health bar is empty, he falls to the grounds and loses a life. He starts the game with 3 lives. He can go only to the right but sometimes down into sewers. He can use either his hands, feet, or stick to attack. Enemies include flying dragons, street thugs, other ninja, bears, frogs, and other anthropomorphic animals, one of the enemies resembles Raphael from Teenage Mutant Ninja Turtles, in the second level of the game, one of the enemies resembles Splinter.

Reception
Home of the Underdogs considers Ninja Rabbits to be horrendous due to bad controls, very easy gameplay, drab background palettes, and slow animations.

References

http://www.homeoftheunderdogs.net/game.php?id=4820
http://www.homeoftheunderdogs.net/game.php?name=International+Ninja+Rabbits

1991 video games
DOS games
Amiga games
Beat 'em ups
Atari ST games
Commodore 64 games
Japan in non-Japanese culture
Video games about rabbits and hares
Video games about ninja
Video games developed in the United Kingdom